Solanum carolinense, the Carolina horsenettle, is not a true nettle, but a member of the Solanaceae, or nightshade family. It is a perennial herbaceous plant, native to the southeastern United States, though its range has expanded throughout much of temperate North America. The plant is an invasive in parts of Europe, Asia, and Australia. The stem and undersides of larger leaf veins are covered with prickles.

"Horsenettle" is also written "horse nettle" or "horse-nettle", though USDA publications usually use the one-word form. Though there are other horsenettle nightshades, S. carolinense is the species most commonly called "the horsenettle". Other common names include radical weed, sand brier or briar, bull nettle, tread-softly, Solanum mammosum ("apple of Sodom"), devil's tomato and wild tomato.

Description
Both surfaces are covered with fine hairs. Leaves smell like potatoes when crushed. The flowers have five petals and are usually white or purple with yellow centers, though there is a blue variant that resembles the tomato flower. The fruits are berries that resemble tomatoes. The immature fruit is dark green with light green stripes, turning yellow and wrinkled as it matures. Each fruit contains around 60 seeds. It flowers throughout the summer, from April to October (on the northern hemisphere). Stems of older plants are woody.

Toxicity
All parts of the plant, including its tomato-like fruit, are poisonous to varying degrees due to the presence of solanine glycoalkaloids which is a toxic alkaloid and one of the plant's natural defenses. While ingesting any part of the plant can cause fever, headache, scratchy throat, nausea, vomiting, and diarrhea, ingesting the fruit can cause abdominal pain, circulatory and respiratory depression, or even death.

Ecology

Habitat
These plants can be found growing in pastures, roadsides, railroad margins, and in disturbed areas and waste ground. They prefer full sun, but can tolerate both wet or dry conditions. They grow readily in sandy or loamy soils, and may also tolerate a wide range of soil types. They are most vigorous and most likely to become weedy or dominate on disturbed sites, but can also be found in less disturbed habitats.

Faunal associations and diseases
Bumble bees pollinate the flowers of this species.

At least thirty-two insects, as well as the meadow vole Microtus pennsylvanicus, have been recorded feeding on this species in Virginia alone.  The caterpillars of the Synanthedon rileyana moth and the Manduca sexta (tobacco hornworm) moth feeds on the plant.  Manduca sexta moths prefer inbred plants to outbred plants. The beetle Leptinotarsa juncta specializes on this plant, and the beetle Epitrix fuscula (eggplant flea beetle) eats it as well.  These two beetles are its two primary herbivores, and can reduce fruit production by as much as 75% relative to plants protected from all insects.  Anthonomus nigrinus feeds on the flowers, and Trichobaris trinotata bores into the stems.  This plant is also eaten by Leptinotarsa decemlineata (the Colorado potato beetle) and has been recorded as being eaten at very low rates by pupae of an unidentified species of the family Gelechiidae.

Parasitic nematodes of the genus Pratylenchus have been found on lesions on its roots, however causing little damage. The fungus Rhizoctonia solani was found causing root rot, particularly under wet conditions in plants damaged by trampling. The plant is also affected by Erysiphe cichoracearum, causing powdery mildew.

Fruits are eaten by a variety of native animals, including ring-necked pheasant, bobwhite, wild turkey, and striped skunk. Most mammals avoid eating the stems and leaves due to both the spines and toxicity of the plant.

Weed
Carolina horsenettle is considered a noxious weed in several US states. It can spread vegetatively by underground rhizomes as well as by seed. It is resistant to many postemergent herbicides and somewhat resistant to broad-spectrum herbicides such as glyphosate and 2,4-D. In fact, herbicide use often selects for horsenettle by removing competing weeds. It is an especially despised weed by gardeners who hand-weed, as the prickles tend to penetrate the skin and then break off when the plant is grasped. The deep root also makes it difficult to remove.

References

External links

 Solanum carolinense Missouri Plants
  Texas A&M University, AgriLife Research & Extension Center at Uvalde, Carolina Horse Nettle

carolinense
Medicinal plants
Flora of North America
Plants described in 1753
Taxa named by Carl Linnaeus